Luwellyn Tyrone Landers is the Deputy Minister of International Relations and Cooperation in South Africa, along with Reginah Mhaule. He has participated in the following parliamentary committees: Justice and Constitutional Development, Joint Standing Committee on Intelligence, Joint Committee on Ethics and Members Interest, as well as the ANC National Disciplinary Committee.

See also

African Commission on Human and Peoples' Rights
Constitution of South Africa
History of the African National Congress
Politics in South Africa
Provincial governments of South Africa

References

Year of birth missing (living people)
Living people
21st-century South African politicians
Government ministers of South Africa